Prototyphis eos is a species of sea snail, a marine gastropod mollusk in the family Muricidae, the murex snails or rock snails.

There are two subspecies : 
 Prototyphis eos eos (Hutton, 1873)
 Prototyphis eos paupereques (Powell, 1974) (synonym : Prototyphis paupereques (Powell, 1974) )

Description
The size of an adult shell varies between 15 mm and 30 mm.

Distribution
This marine species is found along Australia and Northern New Zealand.

References

 Merle D., Garrigues B. & Pointier J.-P. (2011) Fossil and Recent Muricidae of the world. Part Muricinae. Hackenheim: Conchbooks. 648 pp. page(s): 148
 Powell A. W. B., New Zealand Mollusca, William Collins Publishers Ltd, Auckland, New Zealand 1979

External links
 
 

Muricidae
Gastropods described in 1873